Eucalyptus effusa, commonly known as rough-barked gimlet, is a species of mallee or small tree that is endemic to Western Australia. It has thin, rough bark on the base of the trunk, smooth bark above, linear to narrow lance-shaped adult leaves, flower buds arranged in groups of seven, white flowers and cup-shaped to conical fruit.

Description
It has persistent, thin ribbony bark on the trunk, sometimes on the lower branches and smooth brownish bark above. Flowering mainly occurs from October to March and the flowers are white.

Taxonomy and naming
Eucalyptus effusa was first formally described in 1976 by the botanist Ian Brooker who published the description in the journal Nuytsia. The type specimen was collected by George Chippendale between Norseman and Balladonia in 1967.

In 1991, Lawrie Johnson and Ken Hill described two subspecies that have been accepted by the Australian Plant Census and the descriptions were published in the journal Telopea:
 Eucalyptus effusa  Brooker subsp. effusa, commonly known as rough-barked gimlet, has a conical operculum;
 Eucalyptus effusa subsp. exsul, commonly known as desert gimlet, has a rounded operculum and slightly glaucous branchlets.

E. effusa  is one of the nine true gimlet species that have buds in groups of seven, and the only gimlet that is a mallee. The other true gimlets are E. campaspe, E. creta, E. diptera, E. jimberlanica, E. ravida, E. terebra, E. salubris and E. tortilis.

Distribution and habitat
Rough-barked gimlet is found on stony rises and plains between the Fraser Range and Balladonia in the Coolgardie and Nullarbor biogeographic regions of Western Australia where it grows in shallow sandy or loamy soils over greenstone or laterite.

Desert gimlet is only known from a small area near Youanmi.

Conservation status
Both subspecies of Eucalyptus effusa are classified as "not threatened" by the Western Australian Government Department of Parks and Wildlife.

See also
List of Eucalyptus species

References

Endemic flora of Western Australia
Mallees (habit)
Myrtales of Australia
Eucalypts of Western Australia
effusa
Plants described in 1976
Taxa named by Ian Brooker